Fabrizio Varano (died 1508) was a Roman Catholic prelate who served as Bishop of Camerino (1482–1508).

Biography
On 13 June 1482, Fabrizio Varano was appointed during the papacy of Pope Julius II as Bishop of Camerino.
He served as Bishop of Camerino until his death on 7 March 1508.

References

External links and additional sources
 (for Chronology of Bishops) 
 (for Chronology of Bishops) 

16th-century Italian Roman Catholic bishops
15th-century Italian Roman Catholic bishops
Bishops appointed by Pope Julius II
1508 deaths